Ciudad Jardín is the southernmost part of Santiago de Cali in western Colombia.  This community is home of some of the wealthiest living in Colombia today.  It contains many commercial parks such as the Jardin Plaza which is one of the largest outdoor shopping centres in Colombia.

Populated places in the Valle del Cauca Department